Yumashev, also spelled Yumasheva (feminine), may refer to:

 Andrey Borisovich Yumashev (1902-1988), Soviet aviator
 Ivan Stepanovich Yumashev (1895-1972), Soviet admiral
 Tatyana Yumasheva (b. 1960), daughter of former Russian President Boris Yeltsin
 Valentin Yumashev (b. 1957), Russian journalist and politician